Real Murcia Club de Fútbol, S.A.D., commonly known as Real Murcia ("Royal Murcia"), is a Spanish football club based in Murcia, in the Región de Murcia. Founded in 1919, it currently plays in Primera División RFEF – Group 2, playing home matches at Estadio Nueva Condomina, which holds 31,179 spectators.

In domestic football, the club has won a record 8 Segunda División titles and 1 Spanish Royal Federation Cup.

Home colours are mainly scarlet shirt and white shorts.

History
Officially founded in 1919 as Levante Foot-ball Club
(records show earlier denominations, such as 1903's Foot Ball Club de Murcia and 1906's Murcia Football Club), Real Murcia was named as such, in 1923–24, by King Alfonso XIII. The following year, the La Condomina stadium was opened, with the club holding home games there for the next 82 years uninterrupted.

In 1929 the club first competed in the Tercera División (third tier), achieving its first ever promotion to La Liga in 1939–40. The highest position of 11th was reached in 1945, 1946, 1984 and 1987.

Murcia holds the record for the most Segunda División titles with eight, most recently in 2002–03 under manager David Vidal. In that season, the team also equalled its best run in the Copa del Rey by reaching the quarter-finals before losing on the away goals rule to Deportivo de La Coruña, despite a 4–3 win in the second leg at home.

Following an immediate descent back to Segunda in last place, the team won promotion to the top flight for the last time under Lucas Alcaraz in 2007, again lasting only one year. In June 2010, the team fell into Segunda División B for the first time in a decade with a 1–1 draw at Girona FC on the final day, with goalkeeper Alberto Cifuentes saving a penalty kick from Kiko Ratón in added time before it deflected in off himself.

Murcia returned immediately to the second tier, winning the 2010–11 Segunda División B title with a penalty shootout win over CE Sabadell FC in June after a 1–1 aggregate draw. In 2014, the team finished fourth and was top seeded for the playoffs, losing 2–1 on aggregate to eventual winners Córdoba CF; weeks later Murcia were relegated for non-compliance with Liga de Fútbol Profesional regulations.

In 2019, Murcia won the Spanish Royal Federation Cup for the first time with a penalty shootout victory over CD Tudelano.

Current squad
.

Out of loan

Season to season

Murcia Regional Championship

Honours

League 
Segunda División:
 Winners (8): 1939–40, 1954–55, 1962–63, 1972–73, 1979–80, 1982–83, 1985–86, 2002–03

Cups 
Copa Federación de España:
 Winners (1): 2019–20

See also
Real Murcia Imperial – Murcia's reserve team

References

External links

Official website 
Futbolme team profile 
BDFutbol team profile
MurciaMania, all about the club 
La Futbolteca, Real Murcia CF 

Real Murcia
Football clubs in the Region of Murcia
Association football clubs established in 1919
1919 establishments in Spain
Sport in Murcia
M
Segunda División clubs
La Liga clubs
Primera Federación clubs